The Amici Dance Theatre Company, founded by Wolfgang Stange in 1980 and based in London, UK, is a physically integrated dance company which includes dancers with physical and also mental disabilities. The company are the community artists in residence at the Lyric Hammersmith theatre.

The approach of Stange has been described as one that directly incorporates each dancer's unique qualities into the dance: Stange was inspired by his dance teacher, Hilde Holger. Holger, a Viennese-trained dancer, taught dance to her son, who had Down Syndrome. In 1968, she used her experience teaching her son to mount a production with both physically and mentally disabled dancers. The dance piece, titled Towards the Light, was performed at the prestigious Sadler's Wells Theatre.

Repertoire
Some of the notable works by the company include:

References

External links

Contemporary dance companies
Dance companies in the United Kingdom
Physically integrated dance
1980 establishments in the United Kingdom